The discography of Snow Patrol, an alternative rock band from Northern Ireland and based in Dundee, Scotland, consists of seven studio albums, thirty-one singles, eight extended plays, three compilation albums and one live DVD. Snow Patrol was formed in 1994 by Gary Lightbody, Michael Morrison and Mark McClelland under the name Shrug. They released an extended play (EP) titled The Yogurt vs. Yogurt Debate. Morrison left in 1995, and the band changed their name to Polarbear. Under this name they released their other EP, Starfighter Pilot, on the Electric Honey label. Drummer Jonny Quinn joined in 1997 and the band signed to Jeepster Records the same year. They then underwent their final name change to Snow Patrol. The band's first two studio albums: Songs for Polarbears and When It's All Over We Still Have to Clear Up were released in 1998 and 2001 respectively, but failed to do well commercially. Subsequently, the band was dropped by the label.

Guitarist Jason Gunn joined in 2002 and Snow Patrol was signed to Fiction and Interscope record labels in 2003. Their third studio album, Final Straw, was released the same year, and was a commercial success. "Run" became their breakthrough single in the United Kingdom, charting in the top 5 on the singles chart. The album eventually sold 1.6 million copies in the UK and won the Ivor Novello Album Award. During the end of the Final Straw Tour of 2003–2005, founding bassist Mark McClelland was fired. The band recruited Paul Wilson as his replacement, and touring keyboardist Tom Simpson was made a permanent member of the band. The next album, Eyes Open, released in 2006, was more successful. Sales of the album were boosted by the success of the Grammy-nominated "Chasing Cars", which reached the top 10 in the UK and sold 2.5 million downloads in the US. The album itself won a Meteor Award and was nominated for several more. It sold 2.1 million copies in the UK and achieved platinum status in the United States.

The band's fifth album A Hundred Million Suns was released in 2008. A compilation, titled Up to Now, featuring songs from the group's 15-year career, was released in November 2009. The band has sold more than ten million albums worldwide.

Albums

Studio albums

Compilation albums

Extended plays

Notes

 A Released under the name Shrug
 B Released under the name Polarbear
 C Released exclusively to iTunes
 D Released exclusively to independent stores in United States

Singles

Other charted songs

Video albums

Music videos

Notes

 A Video uses the "Phil Vinall Mix" of the song
 B Video uses the "Radio Edit" of the song
 C Video uses the "AAA Mix" of the song
 D Video uses an edit of the song
 E Video uses a remix of the song
 F Video uses the 'Arni & Kinski' version with scenes added from Grey's Anatomy
 G Video uses the "Single Version" of the song

Other appearances

Notes

References
General

 Note: Need to view Page 2 as well.

Specific

External links
Snow Patrol official website

Snow Patrol at MusicBrainz
Snow Patrol at Rolling Stone

Discography
Discographies of British artists
Rock music group discographies
Alternative rock discographies